Dominique Pinto (born 1989), known by her stage name Dom La Nena, is a Brazilian cellist, singer and songwriter. Her debut album, Ela, was released in January 2013 (USA and Canada).

Early life 
Dominique Pinto was born in 1989 in Porto Alegre, Brazil. She began studying piano at the age of five, before shifting to the cello three years later. At the age of eight Dom moved to Paris while her father pursued his doctorate. Upon moving back to Brazil five years later at the age of thirteen, Dom began writing letters to the acclaimed American cellist Christine Walevska. Known as "the goddess of the cello", Walevska encouraged Dom to move to Buenos Aires and become her student. With her parents' consent Dom relocated to Argentina where she studied under Walevska for several years.

Career 
Dom returned to Paris at eighteen and soon found herself booked to play her first pop gig, a session with British singer-actress Jane Birkin. Over the next two years Dom toured with Birkin, also supporting French singer-actress Jeanne Moreau. Upon returning from Birkin's international tour, Dom set about working on her first album. The writing process, though, proved quite challenging. It was at a social dinner in Paris that Dom met and soon struck up an artistic partnership with singer-songwriter Piers Faccini, whom her director husband Jeremiah had made several videos for. Faccini suggested that Dom use his home studio in the Cevennes Mountains of France, where in less than a week she recorded almost all her parts. Facinni then set to adding various instruments over Dom's tracks. What resulted out of this partnership were the thirteen compositions that would become known as Dom's debut album, Ela.

Discography
 2013 – Ela (Six Degrees Records)
 2013 – Golondrina (an EP)
 2014 – Ela por Eles (remixes of Ela)
 2014 – Birds on a wire (duo with Rosemary Standley, Air Rytmo)
 2015 – Soyo (Six Degrees Records)
 2016 – Cantando EP (Six Degrees Records)
 2020 – Ramages / Birds on a Wire (duo with Rosemary Standley, PIAS)
 2021 – Tempo (Six Degrees Records)

References

External links
 
 
  on Six Degrees Records
 
  statistics, tagging and previews at Last.FM
 
 New York Times: https://www.nytimes.com/2013/01/13/arts/music/wooden-wand-and-broadcast-have-new-music.html?_r=0
 Wall Street Journal: https://www.wsj.com/articles/SB10001424127887324391104578224813653874952 
 NPR: https://www.npr.org/2013/02/24/172723654/with-a-passion-for-her-cello-dom-la-nena-debuts-her-vocals
 KCRW: http://www.kcrw.com/music/programs/mb/mb130326dom_la_nena/hd-showcase
 Studio 360: http://www.wnyc.org/story/293256-live-in-studio-dom-la-nena
 WNYC Soundcheck: https://web.archive.org/web/20130509050116/http://soundcheck.wnyc.org/blogs/soundcheck-blog/2012/dec/10/video-premiere-dom-la-nena-no-meu-pais/
 KPFK Melting Pot: 
 American Public Media - The Story: http://www.thestory.org/stories/2013-03/dom-la-nena
 Prix Miroir Musiques et Folklores du monde: https://www.feq.ca/en/FEQ/FEQ-Awards-Winners/Archives?edition=2013#annee
 Les Inrockuptibles: http://www.lesinrocks.com/2013/02/20/musique/le-monde-des-musiques-du-monde-3-11363427/
 O Globo: http://oglobo.globo.com/cultura/uma-voz-de-menina-um-violoncelo-lancam-gaucha-dom-la-nena-no-cenario-mundial-7988367
 Zero Hora: http://zerohora.clicrbs.com.br/rs/cultura-e-lazer/segundo-caderno/noticia/2013/03/aos-23-anos-dom-la-nena-coleciona-elogios-com-disco-de-estreia-4068198.html

1989 births
Living people
Brazilian singer-songwriters
People from Porto Alegre
21st-century Brazilian singers
Brazilian cellists
Brazilian expatriates in France
21st-century Brazilian women singers
Brazilian women singer-songwriters
Six Degrees Records artists
21st-century cellists